Dillingen (Saar) station is on the Saar Railway between Saarbrücken and Trier in the town of Dillingen in the German state of the Saarland. The station is classified by Deutsche Bahn as a category 4 station. A bus station is connected to the station.

Location

Dillingen station is located on the western edge of the town centre of Dillingen, very close to the post office, the pedestrianised Stummstraße, the town hall and the Stadthalle (a venue for cultural events) and is on the bus network of the district transport company, Kreisverkehrsbetriebe Saarlouis and is served by regional buses. Parking is available in front of the entrance building for private short-term parking and bicycles.

The station has a travel centre and shopping. It has step-free access to platforms 1 and the island platform serving tracks 4 and 5.

The station is the terminus of the Nied Valley Railway (Niedtalbahn) to Niedaltdorf and until 1945 passenger services ran to Bouzonville and at times to Metz. Once a year on Good Friday, services again run over this line over the French border to Bouzonville.

Entrance building

The original station building was opened in 1858 and completely renovated between 1890 and the First World War. The precise date of construction of the new building is not known. The building is built as a rectangular building with irregular projections, but its exterior has complex shapes.

Services

Dillingen station is part of the Saarländischer Verkehrsverbund (SaarVV; Saarland Transport Association), and it is in fare zone 411 (Dillingen). It is served by the following lines (Dec 2016):

Notes

External links

 

Railway stations in the Saarland
Buildings and structures in Saarlouis (district)
Railway stations in Germany opened in 1858